The 155mm L33 Argentine Model gun (Argentine Army denomination: Cañón 155 mm. L 33 Modelo Argentino) is an Argentine artillery field gun in service with the Argentine Army.

Development 
Developed in late 1970s by CITEFA as obus 155 mm L33 X1415 CITEFA Modelo 77 in order to replace the World War II era M114 155 mm howitzer still in service in the Argentine Army. The ordnance is based on the gun carried by the French Mk F3 155mm self-propelled gun, also in service with the Argentine Army.

Also designed by CITEFA is a slightly improved version named "Modelo 81".

Service 
Examples of Modelo 77 were used during the Falklands War. A total four guns were captured by the British, these were flown in via Argentine Air Force C-130 Hercules during the conflict's last weeks in order to repel British naval gun fire after direct request from Argentinian commander to Buenos Aires Junta. They were feared by British soldiers and were considered high value targets for British commanders.

Some were sold on the black market and were purchased by the Croatian Army where they were used in combat with Serbian forces during the Croatian War of Independence.

Operators

Current operators
 : Argentine Army - 109
 : Croatian Army - 12-18

See also 
 Cañón 155 mm. L 45 CALA 30

References

Bibliography

External links 
 Official Argentine Army website - Artillery Branch, field artillery equipment webpage  
 Official Argentine Army Military Academy webpage - Artillery Branch webpage   
 Citefa Modelo 77 Obusier

155 mm artillery
Artillery of Argentina
Field artillery of the Cold War
Field artillery
Fabricaciones Militares